The Scottish Sub Aqua Club (ScotSAC) was founded in Glasgow in 1953. Today it is a company limited by guarantee with nearly 70 branches and 1200 members.  ScotSAC instructors provide scuba diving training to branch members on an amateur basis.  It is recognised by sportscotland as the National Governing Body for Sub Aqua in Scotland.

ScotSAC has developed a comprehensive training schedule to prepare members to carry out recreational diving safely in the sea around Scotland. The qualifications awarded by ScotSAC are recognised worldwide.

Qualifications 

ScotSAC offers training courses for snorkel, diver and instructor qualifications.

Snorkel qualifications
 Junior Snorkel Diver
 Snorkel Diver

Diver qualifications
 Branch Diver – Depth Limit 15m, unless accompanied by a Master Diver Instructor (New qualification from 2014)
  – Depth limit 30m, unless accompanied by a Master Diver Instructor
  – Depth limit 40m, unless additional Deep Diver qualifications have been obtained or with the permission of the ScotSAC Regional Coach
 First Class Diver

Instructor qualifications
  – BIs instruct in their own branch
 Regional Instructor
 Examiner

Specialist qualifications
 Deep diving Award
 Deep Rescue Endorsement
 Dry Suit Endorsement
 Nitrox
 Oxygen Administration
 Heartstart
 Diver First Aid
 Underwater Archaeology

Archives
The archives of Scottish Sub Aqua Club are maintained by the  Archives of the University of Glasgow (GUAS).

See also

 Sport in Scotland

References

External links
 Scottish Sub Aqua Club – Main Site
 ScotSAC Training
 ScotSAC Branch Locations

Private companies limited by guarantee of Scotland
Sports governing bodies in Scotland
1953 establishments in Scotland
Organizations established in 1953
Underwater diving in the United Kingdom
Underwater diving training organizations